The Terrafirma 3x3 is a Philippine 3x3 basketball team which competes in the PBA 3x3, organized by the Philippines' top-flight professional league, Philippine Basketball Association (PBA). The team is affiliated with the Terrafirma Dyip, a member franchise of the PBA.

History
The Terrafirma Dyip, competing as Terrafirma 3x3, are among the participating PBA franchise teams in the inaugural 2021 PBA 3x3 season.

Current roster

Head coaches

References

PBA 3x3 teams
2021 establishments in the Philippines
Basketball teams established in 2021